Frau Sixta is a 1925 historical novel by the Swiss writer Ernst Zahn.

Adaptation
In 1938 it was turned into a German film Frau Sixta directed by Gustav Ucicky and starring Gustav Fröhlich, Franziska Kinz and Ilse Werner.

References

1925 novels
Swiss historical novels
Novels set in the 1860s
1925 German-language novels
Swiss novels adapted into films